Dihydrobiopterin (BH2) is a pteridine compound produced in the synthesis of L-DOPA, dopamine, serotonin, norepinephrine and epinephrine. It is restored to the required cofactor tetrahydrobiopterin by dihydrobiopterin reductase.

See also 
 Pteridine
 Tetrahydrobiopterin

Biomolecules